Jón Ólafur Jónsson (born 14 July 1981), also known as Nonni Mæju, is an Icelandic basketball player and a former member of the Icelandic men's national basketball team. He was a key player on the Snæfell team that won the Icelandic championship, the Icelandic Basketball Cup, the Icelandic Supercup and the Icelandic Company Cup in 2010. He retired from top-level play after the 2013–14 season due to lingering injuries.

Awards, titles and accomplishments

Individual awards
Úrvalsdeild Domestic All-First team (3): 2011, 2012, 2013

Titles
Icelandic champion: 2010
Icelandic Basketball Cup (2): 2008, 2010
Icelandic Supercup: 2010
Icelandic Company Cup (2): 2007, 2010
Icelandic D1: 1998

Accomplishments
Icelandic All-Star Game Three-Point Shootout champion: 2012

References

External links
Icelandic statistics 2007-2014 at kki.is
Úrvalsdeild karla statistics 1998-2007 at kki.is
Profile at realgm.com

1981 births
Living people
Jon Olafur Jonsson
Jon Olafur Jonsson
Stjarnan men's basketball players
Snæfell men's basketball players
Forwards (basketball)